Angel Dust is the sixteenth studio album by American rapper Z-Ro. It was released on October 2, 2012, by Rap-A-Lot Records, Universal Republic Records and the independently-incorporated label founded by J Prince. The album features guest appearances from B.G., Lil Flea, Mike D, Lil Flip and K-Rino.

Commercial performance
The album debuted at number 110 on the Billboard 200, with first-week sales of 3,700 copies in the United States.

Track listing

References

2012 albums
Z-Ro albums
Rap-A-Lot Records albums